= Jhhirniya =

Jhhirniya Jhirniya
- village
- Location within Madhya Pradesh Location within India
- Coordinates: 23.3529382°N 77.2387191°E
- Country: India
- State: Madhya Pradesh
- District: Bhopal
- Tehsil: Huzur
- Elevation: 516 m (1,693 ft)

Population (2011)
  - Total: 1,100
- Time zone: UTC+5:30 (IST)
- ISO 3166 code: MP-IN
- 2011 census code: 482349

Jhhirniya is a village in the Bhopal district of Madhya Pradesh, India. It is located in the Huzur tehsil and the Phanda block.

== Demographics ==
According to the 2011 census of India, Jhhirniya has 262 households. The effective literacy rate (i.e. the literacy rate of population excluding children aged 6 and below) is 53.87%.

Demographics (2011 Census)
	Total	Male	Female
Population	1100	590	510
Children aged below 6 years	222	117	105
Scheduled caste	89	47	42
Scheduled tribe	151	85	66
Literates	473	303	170
Workers (all)	564	327	237
Main workers (total)	272	257	15
Main workers: Cultivators	23	22	1
Main workers: Agricultural labourers	32	30	2
Main workers: Household industry workers	1	1	0
Main workers: Other	216	204	12
Marginal workers (total)	292	70	222
Marginal workers: Cultivators	11	2	9
Marginal workers: Agricultural labourers	30	1	29
Marginal workers: Household industry workers	2	0	2
Marginal workers: Others	249	67	182
Non-workers	536	263	273
